Zong may refer to:

 Zong (surname), including a list of people with the name
 Zong (payments provider), American micropayments provider
 Zong (mobile network), mobile data network provider in Pakistan
 Zong!, a 2008 book-length poem by M. NourbeSe Philip
 Zong massacre, a 1781 slave massacre on the British slave ship Zong
 Zongzi, or zong, a traditional Chinese rice dish

See also 

 Zhuang (surname)
 Dzong architecture, a type of fortified monastery architecture in Bhutan and Tibet
 Crystals of Zong, maze-chase game wfor the Commodore 64 
 Dai Zong, a fictional character in Water Margin, a classic Chinese novel
 Zing Zong, a 1991 soukous album by Kanda Bongo Man